Rubén Flores Gómez (born 3 October 1968) is a Mexican former professional footballer and was most recently the manager of the Cayman Islands women's national team.

Playing career
Flores had a stint in the Mexican Primera División with Atlante where he appeared in a total of 11 matches and recorded one goal. In 2003, he was signed by the Brampton Hitmen of the Canadian Professional Soccer League. He scored his first goal for the organization on 4 July 2003 in a 2–0 victory over Toronto Croatia. In the first round of the postseason the Hitmen faced Toronto Croatia, and Flores scored the equalizing goal to conclude the match to a 1–1 draw. The game went into penalties with Toronto winning 4–3 in the shootout. After Toronto Croatia was caught fielding an illegal player the league reversed the result and Brampton advanced to the next round.

Brampton's next opponents would end up being London City, where once again the match went into penalties with Flores contributing a successful penalty kick, and the match concluding in a 5–3 victory. He featured in CPSL Championship match against Vaughan Sun Devils coming on as a substitute for team captain Phil Ionadi. Brampton would end up winning the match by a score of 1–0, thus marking the franchise's first Championship.

Coaching career
Flores retired from competitive soccer after the 2003 season and served as an Ontario Soccer Association Provincial and Regional Head Coach from 2005 till 2011 debuting with the Burlington Bulldogs 88's. In 2011, he was appointed Technical Director for Guelph Soccer. In 2012, he served as assistant coach under Brett Mosen for Hamilton Rage of the Premier Development League.

On 26 February 2013 he was appointed the first head coach for K-W United  for the USL W-League. After controversy regarding his professional soccer resume, Flores was dismissed from his post of head coach. On 22 May 2014, he was named the head coach for the Cayman Islands women's national football team.

Personal life
Flores is married to a Canadian woman of English descent and they have three children, who are also footballers: Silvana, who was runner-up of the 2018 FIFA U-17 Women's World Cup with Mexico and has capped at senior level; Marcelo, who was called up to the Mexico national under–16 team, and Tatiana, who was called up to the Mexico women's national under–15 team.

Honours 

Brampton Hitmen
 CPSL Championship: 2003

References 

1968 births
Living people
Footballers from Mexico City
Mexican footballers
Association football forwards
Atlante F.C. footballers
Brampton Stallions (Hitmen) players
Canadian Soccer League (1998–present) players
Mexican expatriate footballers
Expatriate soccer players in Canada
Mexican expatriate sportspeople in Canada
Mexican football managers
Mexican expatriate football managers
Expatriate football managers in the Cayman Islands
Mexican expatriate sportspeople in the Cayman Islands